Gurai is a village in Ujhani Tehsil and Budaun district, Uttar Pradesh, India. The major cast of the village residents is Kurmi. The village is administrated by Gram Panchayat. Budaun railway station is 6 KM away from the village. Its village code is 128461.

References

Villages in Budaun district